The PSE Financials Index, is the main stock market index of the Philippine Stock Exchange for banks and financial entities.

This index is one of the PSE indices also home to companies listed on the PSE Composite Index, namely Banco de Oro Universal Bank, Bank of the Philippine Islands and Metrobank.

The index is a continuation of the former PSE Financial Index, which was renamed during the reclassification of the PSE's indices on January 2, 2006.

Companies
The following companies are listed on the PSE Financials Index:

Former members

See also
Philippine Stock Exchange

Philippine stock market indices